Ahmad Hazer (born 4 September 1989) is a Lebanese hurdler. He tested positive for the anabolic steroid Metenolone in 2013, and was handed a two-year ban from the sport.

Early life 
Hazer grew up in Beirut, Lebanon. His older brother, Ali Hazer, is also an athlete.

Career
He competed in the 60 m indoor hurdles at the 2010 IAAF World Indoor Championships with a time of 8.36 s and in the 110 meter hurdles at the 2012 Summer Olympics with a time of 14.82, as he came in last in the first round, heat four, and was eliminated.  Hazer holds several Lebanese records, including the 110 m hurdles and 300 m. He was the first Lebanese athlete to run sub 14s over 110m hurdles.

Hazer tested positive for the anabolic steroid Metenolone, in an out-of-competition control 11 June 2013. He was subsequently handed a two-year ban from the sport.

International competitions

References

External links
 
 

1989 births
Living people
Sportspeople from Beirut
Lebanese male hurdlers
Lebanese sportspeople in doping cases
Olympic athletes of Lebanon
Athletes (track and field) at the 2012 Summer Olympics
Athletes (track and field) at the 2016 Summer Olympics
World Athletics Championships athletes for Lebanon
Doping cases in athletics
Athletes (track and field) at the 2013 Mediterranean Games
Mediterranean Games competitors for Lebanon